`t Ploegske was a football stadium in Breda, Netherlands. It was used for football matches and hosted the home matches of NAC Breda. The stadium was able to hold 3,000 people, including 150 seats. The stadium was opened in 1916 and demolished in 1931.

References

Defunct football venues in the Netherlands
NAC Breda
Sports venues in Breda
Sports venues completed in 1916
Sports venues demolished in 1931
History of Breda